Prelez Gap (‘Sedlovina Prelez’ \se-dlo-vi-'na 'pre-lez\) is the flat ice-covered saddle of elevation 793 m on Trinity Peninsula in Graham Land, Antarctica, which is linking Marescot Ridge to the northwest to Louis-Philippe Plateau to the southeast. It is overlooking the upper course of Malorad Glacier to the west.

The gap is named after the settlement of Prelez in Northeastern Bulgaria.

Location
German-British mapping in 1996.

Maps
 Trinity Peninsula. Scale 1:250000 topographic map No. 5697. Institut für Angewandte Geodäsie and British Antarctic Survey, 1996.
 Antarctic Digital Database (ADD). Scale 1:250000 topographic map of Antarctica. Scientific Committee on Antarctic Research (SCAR). Since 1993, regularly updated.

Notes

References
 Prelez Gap. SCAR Composite Antarctic Gazetteer
 Bulgarian Antarctic Gazetteer. Antarctic Place-names Commission. (details in Bulgarian, basic data in English)

External links
 Prelez Gap. Copernix satellite image

Mountain passes of Trinity Peninsula
Bulgaria and the Antarctic